Evgenia Citkowitz (born Eugenia Citkowitz; 1964) is an American playwright, author and journalist.

Early life and family
Eugenia Citkowitz was born in 1964 in the state of New York, the youngest of two daughters to Israel Citkowitz, an American pianist, composer and piano teacher, and Lady Caroline Blackwood, an English writer. Her parents divorced in 1972, although her father continued to live nearby and helped raise her and her sisters until his death. Citkowitz has four half-siblings. Her stepfather was Robert Lowell, an American poet.

Citkowitz attended a boarding school in Devon, South West England.   During her teenage years, she attended St Paul's Girls' School in Hammersmith. Citkowitz graduated with a degree in English literature from Oxford University. She was educated, briefly, in the United States.

Citkowitz grew up in London, England. About her childhood, she said [she had a] "chaotic home life, lonely at times, although I met many interesting people."

Family 
Through her mother, Citkowitz is a member of the Guinness family, a prominent Irish and British family in brewing, banking and politics. Citkowitz is an heiress to the Guinness beer fortune.

Citkowitz's maternal grandparents were Maureen Constance Guinness, an Anglo-Irish socialite, and Basil Hamilton-Temple-Blackwood, 4th Marquess of Dufferin and Ava, an English politician. Her uncle and aunt were Sheridan Hamilton-Temple-Blackwood, 5th Marquess of Dufferin and Ava, an English noble, and Lindy Hamilton-Temple-Blackwood, Marchioness of Dufferin and Ava, an English conservationist, and Citkowitz's fifth cousin.

Career
In 2007, Citkowitz's first play Ether Dome premiered at the Manhattan Theatre Club, and was a finalist for the Pulitzer Prize for Drama.

Citkowitz's first book Ether was published in 2010, a collection of seven short stories and a novella. Ether was picked as New York Times Editors' Choice and made it to The New Yorker's Book Club.

Citkowitz's debut novel The Shades, a psychological thriller, was published on 19 June 2018. The Shades covers the impact of a daughter's death on a family as they try to move on with their grief. Citkowitz stated that the purpose of the novel was to look into the "fragility of human existence" and the original story grew from the idea of "someone returning to their childhood home" that she then expanded upon. One of her primary focuses was to create characters that felt "authentic as people" in order to form empathy in the reader and also why she researched the intricacies of the fields and hobbies each of the characters practice in the novel, such as pottery.

Citkowitz has written for various publications across the United Kingdom and the United States, including The Sunday Times, The London Magazine, The Guardian, The New York Times and Harper's Bazaar.

Published works 
 Citkowitz, Evgenia (2010). Ether. Farrar, Straus and Giroux. .
 Citkowitz, Evgenia (2018). The Shades. W. W. Norton & Company. .

Accolades 
Citkowitz has previously been longlisted for The Sunday Times EFG Private Bank Short Story Award, and was one of the winners of The Word Factory's Neil Gaiman, Fables for a Modern World story competition.

Personal life
Citkowitz keeps her personal life mostly private. On 22 September 1990, Citkowitz married Julian Sands, an English actor; after being introduced by John Malkovich. The couple have two daughters and she is stepmother to a son from Sands' first marriage.  Since 2020, Citkowitz and her family have permanently resided in Los Angeles, California.

References

Living people
1964 births
British women journalists